Aristotle, Inc. is a U.S. company founded and led by brothers John Aristotle Phillips and Dean Aristotle Phillips in 1983, specializing in data mining voter data for political campaigns.

See also
 Vocus

References

Public relations companies of the United States
Consulting firms established in 1983
1983 establishments in the United States
1983 establishments in Washington, D.C.